Denis Sergeyevich Ivanov (born 3 October 1983) is a former Russian professional football player.

Club career
He played two seasons in the Russian Football National League for FC Metallurg Lipetsk.

External links
 

1983 births
Sportspeople from Bishkek
Living people
Russian footballers
Association football midfielders
FC Metallurg Lipetsk players
FC Rotor Volgograd players